Following is an incomplete list of past and present Members of Parliament (MPs) of the United Kingdom whose surnames begin with J.  The dates in parentheses are the periods for which they were MPs. 

Alister Jack
Michael Jack
Glenda Jackson
Helen Jackson
Stewart Jackson
Robert V. Jackson
James Berkeley, 3rd Earl of Berkeley
Archibald James
David James
Henry James, 1st Baron James of Hereford
Sian James
David Jamieson
Greville Janner
Sajid Javid
Lena Jeger
Santo Jeger
Bernard Jenkin
Patrick Jenkin
Brian Jenkins
Toby Jessel
Roy Jenkins
John Coventry
Alan Johnson
Boris Johnson
Diana Johnson
Melanie Johnson
Geoffrey Johnson-Smith
Thomas Johnston
Barry Jones, Baron Jones
David Jones
Elwyn Jones, Baron Elwyn-Jones
Fiona Jones
Helen Jones
Ieuan Wyn Jones
Jon Owen Jones
Kevan Jones
Lynne Jones
Martyn Jones
Nigel Jones
Ruth Jones
Michael Jopling
Keith Joseph
Tessa Jowell
William Jowitt, 1st Earl Jowitt
Eric Joyce
William Joynson-Hicks, 1st Viscount Brentford

 J